Vegard Opaas (born 11 January 1962) is a Norwegian former ski jumper.

Career
On 15 March 1987 in Planica he jumped 193 metres (633 ft) in the third round, which was canceled right after. At that time this was the second longest jump in history.

He had his biggest season in 1987 when he became the first Norwegian ski jumper to win the overall World Cup, a feat later only matched by Espen Bredesen in 1993/94, and Anders Bardal in 2011/12.

That same year he won three medals at the world championships in Oberstdorf. This included two silvers (individual large hill, team large hill) and one bronze (individual normal hill).
He also finished eighth in the normal hill event at the 1984 Winter Olympics in Sarajevo he also participated in the 1988 Winter Olympics in Calgary, Alberta, Canada.

World Cup

Standings

Wins

References

External links

Norwegian male ski jumpers
Olympic ski jumpers of Norway
Ski jumpers at the 1984 Winter Olympics
Ski jumpers at the 1988 Winter Olympics
1961 births
Living people
FIS Nordic World Ski Championships medalists in ski jumping
Skiers from Oslo
20th-century Norwegian people